Little is known about the early history of Haitian license plates. Keith Marvin thought that the earliest plates were from the early 1930s, but older plates have since been found and at least one plate from 1923 exists. Early plates were marked with Rd'H, (République d’Haïti), HA., RH, or Haïti at various times. The Haitian coat of arms appeared on the plates from 1998 to 2002, the country flag was shown on the 2002 - 2005 plates, and since 2006 the background has shown a map of the country. With the last update on the design, the slogan La perle des Antilles was added at the bottom of the plate in white colour.

Passenger baseplates (Privé)

1910 to 1955

1956 to 1977
Like many other countries, Haiti appears to have followed this standard for their plates.

Multiyear plates - 1978 to Present
Starting in 1978 Haitian plates were validated annually with stickers that showed the word "Haiti," the year of expiration, and a random serial number. Beginning circa 1998 the format of the sticker changed so that the year of expiration became the predominant feature of the sticker. 

The 2006 - 2013 issue happened more than a year later than originally planned, so these plates were not used until the beginning of 2007. Different plates were issued for each geographical region of the country. The following region names were shown at the bottom of the plate: Nord-Ouest, Nord, Nord-Est, Artibonite, Centre, Ouest, Sud-Est, Sud, and Grand Anse. Only a single plate was issued. The front plate was replaced by a windshield sticker that would break apart if someone tried to remove it. Owners of vehicles had the choice to register their vehicle where they lived or where they worked. If they moved away from where their vehicle was registered, then the vehicle would need to be re-registered. All plates had two letters followed by five numbers (AB 12345). At the same time as this new system was implemented, right-hand drive vehicles were banned from being imported into Haiti. 

The 2014 issue started 1 October 2014, and the plate backgrounds were given  different colors based on the vehicle type. Known colors are pale blue for private vehicles, heavy vehicles, demonstration, and rental vehicles; pale red for dedicated to public transport and that of goods; and pale green is reserved for the diplomatic corps, consular corps, international organizations, temporary registrations, and tourist transportation.

Diplomatic and International Organization plates

Location and Taxi plates
Location plates indicate a vehicle for hire, and taxi plates are issued to traditional taxi companies.

Transport plates

References

External links

Haiti
Transport in Haiti
Haiti transport-related lists
Hispaniola